Chinese Film Performance Art Academy,  founded in January 1985, is a professional organization of Chinese actors.

Awards
Since 1985, the academy has bi-annually awarded the Golden Phoenix Awards.

The "100 outstanding actors in 100 years of Chinese cinema" 
The Cina Film Performance Art Academy listed the "100 outstanding actors in 100 years of Chinese cinema", for the 100th anniversary of Chinese film industry in 2005. The list was officially announced at the 14th Golden Rooster and Hundred Flowers Film Festival in Sanya on 12 November 2005.

1905-1949 
Shangguan Yunzhu, Yu Yang, Yu Lan, Wang Renmei, Wang Danfeng, Feng Zhe, Tian Fang, Bai Yang, Shi Hui, Liu Qiong, Sun Daolin, Ruan Lingyu, Wu Yin, Ng Cho-Fan, Zhang Ping, Zhang Ruifang, Li Wei, Chen Qiang, Zhou Xuan, Jin Shan, Jin Yan, Hu Die, Zhao Dan, Xiang Kun, Qin Yi, Yuan Muzhi, Tao Jin, Huang Zongying, Shu Shi, Shu Xiuwen, Xie Tian, Lan Ma, Bao Fang, Li Lili, Wei Heling.

1949-1976 
Yu Shizhi, Wang Xingang, Wang Yumei, Wang Xiaotang, Wang Fuli, Lisa Lu, Gua Ah-leh, Tian Hua, Zhong Xinghuo, Liu Xiaoqing, Jackie Chan, Zhang Liang, Zhang Yu, Sylvia Chang, Bruce Lee, Li Rentang, Li Moran, Yang Zaibao, Chow Yun-fat, Pang Xueqin, Brigitte Lin, Sihung Lung, Ko Chun-hsiung, Zhu Xijuan, Zhao Ziyue, Zhao Lirong, Tang Guoqiang, Xia Meng, Chin Han, Guo Zhenqing, Tao Yuling, Cui Wei, Xie Fang, Pan Hong.

1976-2004 
Wang Zhiwen, Wang Tiecheng, Ning Jing, Liu Peiqi, Andy Lau, Lü Liping, Gong Li, Zhu Xu, Song Chunli, Zhang Fengyi, Leslie Cheung, Maggie Cheung, Jet Li, Li Baotian, Lee Li-chun, Li Xuejian, Joan Chen, Chen Peisi, Chen Baoguo, Chen Daoming, Stephen Chow, Zheng Zhenyao, Jiang Wen, Xi Meijuan, Tony Leung Ka-fai, Tony Leung Chiu-wai, Anita Mui, Zhang Ziyi, Siqin Gaowa, Ge You, Jiang Wenli, Pu Cunxin.

Presidents
2007-now: Tang Guoqiang
 Vice-president: Zhao Wei, Zhang Guoli, Wang Fuli
2000-2006: Yu Yang
 Vice-president: Tang Guoqiang, Pan Hong, Wang Jinsong

References

External links
Official Site

Arts organizations established in 1985
Entertainment industry unions
Arts organizations based in China
Film organizations in China
Organizations based in Guangzhou
1985 establishments in China